The Idea of Beautiful is the debut studio album by American rapper Rapsody. It was released on August 28, 2012, by independent record label It's A Wonderful World Music Group. The album was released after the critical acclaim of her mixtapes such as Return of the B-Girl (2010), Thank H.E.R. Now (2011) and For Everything (2011); as well as the release of her extended play (EP) The Black Mamba (2012).

Background
The album includes the production by the members of The Soul Council (9th Wonder, Khrysis, E. Jones, AMP, Eric G. and Ka$h). The album features guest appearances from Big Rube, Raheem DeVaughn, Ab-Soul, Mac Miller, The Cool Kids, Buckshot, Childish Gambino, GQ, Big Remo, Heather Victoria, Rocki Evans, BJ the Chicago Kid, and Nomsa Mazwai. The first single was "Believe Me"; its music video was released on YouTube and two more videos were released - the songs "Kind of Love" and "The Drums". All of these music videos were directed by It's a Wonderful World Music Group's in-house director Kenneth Price.

Track listing

Personnel
 Keyboards: Zo! on "Motivation" 
 Acoustic guitar: Nick Hagelin on "Good Good Love"
 Recording engineer: 9th Wonder, Khrysis
 Mixing: Khrysis
 Executive Producer: 9th Wonder & Rapsody
 Artwork and design: Warren "AMP" Hendricks, Jr.
 Photography: Adam Sikora
 Cover Photo: Patrick Douthit

Sample Credits

Destiny
 "You're The One For Me" performed by The Edwards Generation

References

External links
 Undergroundhiphop.com
 Itunes.apple.com
 Youtube.com
 Youtube.com
 Youtube.com

2012 debut albums
Albums produced by 9th Wonder
Albums produced by Khrysis
Rapsody albums